Parasolid is a geometric modeling kernel originally developed by Shape Data Limited, now owned and developed by Siemens Digital Industries Software. It can be licensed by other companies for use in their 3D computer graphics software products.

Parasolid's capabilities include model creation and editing utilities such as Boolean modeling operators, feature modeling support, advanced surfacing, thickening and hollowing, blending and filleting and sheet modeling. It also incorporates modeling with mesh surfaces and lattices. Parasolid also includes tools for direct model editing, including tapering, offsetting, geometry replacement and removal of feature details with automated regeneration of surrounding data. Parasolid also provides wide-ranging graphical and rendering support, including hidden-line, wireframe and drafting, tessellation and model data inquiries.

Parasolid parts are normally saved in XT format, which usually has the file extension .x_t. The format is documented and open. There is also a binary version of the format, usually with an .x_b extension, which is somewhat more compact.

To use Parasolid effectively, software developers need knowledge of CAD in general, computational geometry and topology.

Parasolid is available for Windows (32-bit, 64-bit and ARM64), Linux (64-bit), macOS (Intel and Apple Silicon), iOS, and Android.

Applications
It is used in many Computer-aided design (CAD), Computer-aided manufacturing (CAM), Computer-aided engineering (CAE), Product visualization, and CAD data exchange packages. Notable uses include:

Abaqus
ADINA
Alibre Design
Altair HyperWorks
Ansys
TopSolid
Cimatron E
Delcam
COMSOL Multiphysics
Femap
HyperMesh
IRONCAD
MasterCAM
Medusa
MicroStation
Moldflow
Siemens NX
Onshape
Qinetiq Paramarine
Plasticity
PowerSHAPE
Shapr3D
Simcenter STAR-CCM+
SimScale
Solid Edge
SolidWorks
T-FLEX CAD
Vectorworks
WorkXPlore 3D

References

External links
 Official Parasolid web page

Graphics software
Computer-aided design software
CAD file formats
Siemens software products